Gianluca Cristiano Busio (born May 28, 2002) is an American professional soccer player who plays as a midfielder for  club Venezia and the United States national team.

Club career

Sporting Kansas City
Born in Greensboro, North Carolina, Busio joined the Sporting Kansas City academy in 2016 from North Carolina Fusion.

On August 25, 2017, Busio signed a Homegrown Player contract with Sporting Kansas City, making him the youngest player to sign with a Major League Soccer club since Freddy Adu joined D.C. United in 2004.

He made his professional debut on April 4, 2018, appearing for Sporting Kansas City's United Soccer League affiliate side, Swope Park Rangers, starting in a 1–0 win over Colorado Springs Switchbacks. Busio went on to make his first Major League Soccer appearance for Sporting Kansas City on July 28 as a 77th-minute substitute in a 3–2 loss against FC Dallas. One week later, on August 4, Busio made his first league start for Sporting Kansas City against the Houston Dynamo, which saw three red cards, eight yellow cards, and 28 total fouls. He provided his first career assist on a 74th-minute goal for teammate Diego Rubio, which proved to be the winner in a 1–0 match. Busio was the third-youngest player to start a match in Major League Soccer history.

Venezia
On August 9, 2021, Busio moved to Serie A side Venezia for a club-record transfer fee. The fee was reported to be $6.5 million rising to $10.5 million in potential add-ons. He made his debut for the club on August 27 in a 0–3 defeat to Udinese. He scored his first goal for the club, a last minute equalizer, in a 1–1 draw with Cagliari on October 1.

International career
In October 2019, he was named to the United States squad for the 2019 FIFA U-17 World Cup in Brazil.  On July 11, 2021, Busio made his senior national team debut, substituting for Jackson Yueill in the 62nd minute of the U.S.'s CONCACAF Gold Cup group match against Haiti.

Personal life
Busio is of Italian descent through his Brescia-born father and holds Italian citizenship. His mother is African American. He has an older sister, Ilaria, and an older brother, Matteo, who plays soccer at UNC-Charlotte and whom Gianluca lists as his biggest inspiration.

Career statistics

Club

International

Honors
United States
CONCACAF Gold Cup: 2021

Individual
CONCACAF U-17 Championship Best XI: 2019

References

External links 

 Gianluca Busio at Sporting Kansas City
 

2002 births
Living people
Soccer players from North Carolina
Sportspeople from Greensboro, North Carolina
American soccer players
United States men's international soccer players
United States men's under-20 international soccer players
United States men's youth international soccer players
American people of Italian descent
2021 CONCACAF Gold Cup players
21st-century African-American sportspeople
African-American soccer players
Association football midfielders
CONCACAF Gold Cup-winning players
Homegrown Players (MLS)
Major League Soccer players
Serie A players
Sporting Kansas City players
Sporting Kansas City II players
USL Championship players
Venezia F.C. players